The Harmony of the Gospels is a book written around 400 AD by the Christian philosopher Augustine of Hippo. In the book (which has four separate parts) Augustine assumes that Matthew was the first gospel, followed by Mark and Luke and that John was the last. He then analyzes and relates the specific passages between the gospels, to build a gospel harmony. In the book Augustine views the variations in the gospel accounts in terms of the different focuses of the authors on Jesus: Matthew on royalty, Mark on humanity, Luke on priesthood, and John on divinity.

References

External links
 

5th-century Latin books
Catholic spirituality
Works by Augustine of Hippo